Batadroba Assembly constituency is one of the 126 assembly constituencies of  Assam a north east state of India.  Batadroba is also part of Kaliabor Lok Sabha constituency.

Town Details

Country: India.
 State: Assam.
 District:  Nagaon district.
 Lok Sabha Constituency: Kaliabor Lok Sabha/Parliamentary constituency.
 Assembly Categorisation: Rural
 Literacy Level: 73.78%.
 Eligible Electors as per 2021 General Elections: 1,65,977 Eligible Electors. Male Electors:84,493 . Female Electors: 81,475.
 Geographic Co-Ordinates:    26°23'20.8"N 92°33'24.5"E.
 Total Area Covered: 154 square kilometres.
 Area Includes: hing thana (excluding Dhing mouzah;) Hatichong Mouza in Nowgong thana in Nowgong sub-division; and Silpukhuri Mouza in Mikirbheta thana in Marigaon sub-division, of Nagaon district of Assam.
 Inter State Border : Nagaon.
 Number Of Polling Stations: Year 2011-159,Year 2016-167,Year 2021-84.

Members of Legislative Assembly

Following is the list of past members from this constituency to Assam Legislature:

Election results

2021 result

2016 results

2011 results

2006 result

See also

 Kokrajhar
 List of constituencies of Assam Legislative Assembly

References

External links 
 

Assembly constituencies of Assam
Kokrajhar
 
Nagaon district